Nikoloz Basilashvili was the defending champion, but decided not to compete.

Teymuraz Gabashvili won the tournament after Evgeny Donskoy was forced to retire in the final due to a right ankle injury.

Seeds

Draw

Finals

Top half

Bottom half

References
 Main Draw
 Qualifying Draw

2015 ATP Challenger Tour
2015 Singles